DarkMarket was an English-speaking internet cybercrime forum created by Renukanth Subramaniam in London that was shut down in 2008 after FBI agent J. Keith Mularski infiltrated it using the alias Master Splyntr, leading to more than 60 arrests worldwide. Subramaniam, who used the alias JiLsi, admitted conspiracy to defraud and was sentenced to nearly five years in prison in February 2010. 

DarkMarket also refers to a new darknet market founded in 2019 under the same name. However, German prosecutors in the cities of Koblenz and Oldenburg said 12 January 2021 that they had shut down what was "probably the largest illegal marketplace on the Darknet" called DarkMarket and physically arrested the man believed to operate it near Germany's border with Denmark.

The website allowed buyers and sellers of stolen identities and credit card data to meet and conduct criminal enterprise in an entrepreneurial, peer-reviewed environment. It had 2,500 users at its peak.

According to supervisory special agent Mularski of the FBI's Cyber Initiative & Resource Fusion Unit, their undercover operation was "very successful in getting to the upper echelons of the Dark Market group and we were actually able to run the server and host all the communications that were going on there to make our cases." He obtained full access to everyone using the site and what they were doing by securing the server after gaining Subramaniam's confidence.

In Congressional testimony on November 17, 2009, FBI Deputy Assistant Director, Cyber Division Steven R. Chabinsky described the FBI operation:  

In a speech to the GovSec/FOSE Conference on March 23, 2010, Chabinsky related explained 

Another DarkMarket member, Thomas James Frederick Smith, pleaded guilty on June 10, 2010, to conspiracy to intentionally cause damage to a protected computer and to commit computer fraud.

References

Further reading 
 Glenny, Misha, DarkMarket : cyberthieves, cybercops, and you, New York, NY : Alfred A. Knopf, 2011. 

Internet forums
Organized crime groups in the United States
Carding (fraud)